In enzymology, an agmatine kinase is an enzyme that catalyzes the chemical reaction

ATP + agmatine  ADP + N4-phosphoagmatine

Thus, the two substrates of this enzyme are ATP and agmatine, whereas its two products are ADP and N4-phosphoagmatine.

This enzyme belongs to the family of transferases, specifically those transferring phosphorus-containing groups (phosphotransferases) with a nitrogenous group as acceptor.  The systematic name of this enzyme class is ATP:agmatine N4-phosphotransferase. Other names in common use include phosphagen phosphokinase, and ATP:agmatine 4-N-phosphotransferase.

References

 

EC 2.7.3
Enzymes of unknown structure